NCIA can stand for:

 National Cannabis Industry Association, established in 2010
 NATO Communications and Information Agency, established in 2012
 National Correctional Industries Association, established in 1996
 North Carolina Industrial Association, a civic organization of African Americans in Raleigh, North Carolina that published a newspaper and presented the North Carolina Colored Fair
 Northern Corridor Implementation Authority, responsible for implementing the Northern Corridor Economic Region in Malaysia